The 1943–44 season was the 45th season in the history of Berner Sport Club Young Boys. The team played their home games at Stadion Wankdorf in Bern.

Overview
Young Boys achieved a sixth place finish in the Nationalliga and reached the quarter-finals of the Swiss Cup where they lost to runners-up FC Basel.

Players
 Maurice Glur
 Hans Flühmann
 Friedrich Hurni
 Louis Gobet
 Hans Liniger
 Eugène Walaschek
 Albert Stoll
 Fritz Knecht
 Ernst Giacometti
 Hans Trachsel
 José Puigventos

Competitions

Overall record

Nationalliga

League table

Matches

Swiss Cup

References

BSC Young Boys seasons
Swiss football clubs 1943–44 season